Copts have a long history as a significant Christian minority in Egypt, in which Muslim adherents form the majority. Coptic Christians lost their majority status in Egypt after the 14th century and the spread of Islam in the entirety of North Africa.

The question of Coptic identity was never raised before the rise of pan-Arabism under Nasser in the early 1950s. Copts  viewed themselves as only Coptic Christians without any Arabic identity sentiment that gather 22 Arabic speaking countries. With the rise of pan-Arabism and wars in the region, many Egyptians accepted an Arab identity, but this shift in identity was less prevalent among Copts than among Muslims. Thus, the emergence of Pan-Arabism served to  exacerbate the ethnic and religious difference between Coptic Christians and Muslims in Egypt. Persecution is pivotal to Copts' sense of identity.

Studies have showed the ancient Egyptians to be genetically intermediary between the populations of Southern Europe and Nubia (two frequently-used reference points). A study of Coptic immigrants from Egypt indicated that they have common ancestry with populations in Egypt, as well as also sharing common ancestry with populations of the southern Levant and Saudi Arabia.

Copts as Egyptians 

In Greco-Roman Egypt, the term Copt designated the local population of Egypt, as opposed to the elite group of foreign rulers and settlers (Greeks, Romans, etc.) who came to Egypt from other regions and established prominent empires.

The word Copt was then adopted in English in the 17th century, from New Latin Coptus, Cophtus, which is derived from Arabic collective   "the Copts" with nisba adjective  , plural  ; Also quftī, qiftī, Arabic /f/ representing historical Coptic /p/. an Arabisation of the Coptic word kubti (Bohairic) and/or kuptaion (Sahidic). The Coptic word is in turn an adaptation of the Greek  "Egyptian".

After the Muslim conquest of Egypt, the term Copt became restricted to those Egyptians who remained adhering to the Christian religion.

In their own Coptic language, which represents the final stage of the Egyptian language, the Copts referred to themselves as rem en kēme (Sahidic) ⲣⲙⲛⲕⲏⲙⲉ, lem en kēmi (Fayyumic), rem en khēmi (Bohairic) ⲣⲉⲙ̀ⲛⲭⲏⲙⲓ, which literally means "people of Egypt" or "Egyptians"; cf. Egyptian , Demotic .

Copts take particular pride in their Egyptian identity. Over the centuries, they have always rejected and fought against other identities that foreign rulers attempted to force upon them, stressing their own Egyptian identity. While an integral part of their society, Copts remained culturally and religiously distinct from their surroundings.

Egyptian Liberal Age 

Egypt's struggle for independence from both the Ottoman Empire and Britain was marked by secular Egyptian nationalism, also referred to as Pharaonism. When the Egyptian nationalist leader Saad Zaghlul met the Arab delegates at Versailles in 1918, he insisted that their struggles for statehood were not connected, stressing that the problem of Egypt was an Egyptian problem and not an Arab one. Egyptian nationalism rose to prominence in the 1920s and 1930s. It looked to Egypt's pre-Islamic past and argued that Egypt was part of a larger Mediterranean civilization. This ideology stressed the role of the Nile River and the Mediterranean Sea. It became the dominant mode of expression of Egyptian anti-colonial activists of the pre- and inter-war periods. There was no place for an Arab component in the Egyptian personality at that time, and Egyptians had no Arab orientation as they saw themselves as Egyptians regardless of religion. Foreigners visiting Egypt noted that Egyptians did not possess any Arab sentiment in the first half of the 20th century. As one Arab nationalist of the time put it "Egyptians did not accept that Egypt was a part of the Arab lands, and would not acknowledge that the Egyptian people were part of the Arab nation."

Rise of Arab nationalism 

Arab nationalism began to gain grounds in Egypt in the 1940s following efforts by Syrian, Palestinian and Lebanese intellectuals. Nevertheless, by the end of the 1940s and even after the establishment of the Arab League, historian H. S. Deighton was still writing that "Egyptians are not Arabs, and both they and the Arabs are aware of this fact".

It was not until the Nasser era starting in the 1950s – more than a decade later – that Arab nationalism, and by extension Arab socialism, became a state policy imposed on the Egyptians by the new dictatorship. Under Nasser, Egypt united with Syria to form the United Arab Republic in 1958, then became known as the Arab Republic of Egypt in 1961. The Egyptians' attachment to Arabism, however, was particularly questioned after the 1967 Six-Day War. Nasser's successor Sadat, both through public policy and his peace initiative with Israel, revived an uncontested Egyptian orientation, unequivocally asserting that only Egypt and Egyptians were his responsibility. The terms "Arab", "Arabism" and "Arab unity", save for the new official name, became conspicuously absent. (See also Egyptian Liberal age and Egyptian Republic.)

Copts and Arab identity 

While some non-Coptic authors claim that Copts in Egypt have an Arab identity while Copts in the West tend to identify as "non-Arab", other non-Coptic scholars disagree, stating that "Copts are not Arabs" and that they predate the Arabs' arrival to Egypt 

They viewed Arabs as invaders and foreigners, and glorified the struggles of their ancestors against the Arab invaders between the 7th and the 9th centuries AD. Indubitably, the struggle against these foreign ideologies centered around the Coptic language:

In addition, some Copts resisted Arab nationalism by stressing their pre-Arab identity. They saw themselves as the direct descendants of the Ancient Egyptians, and their language as a bridge linking the Copts to their Ancient Egyptian roots and their civilization that span over 6000 years.

The strongest statement regarding Coptic identity came in 2008 from a prominent Coptic bishop, namely Bishop Thomas of Cusae and Meir, who gave the following speech at the Hudson Institute:

Bishop Thomas' words gained widespread approval within the Coptic community. One other Coptic bishop, namely Bishop Picenti of Helwan and Massarah commented on the issue saying:

Other prominent Coptic figures who supported Bishop Thomas' statement included the Coptic writer Magdy Khalil who wrote in el-Dostoor newspaper:

See also 
 Copts
 Christian Egypt
 Pharaonism
 Egyptians
 Egyptian nationalism
 Coptic nationalism

References 

Coptic culture
Coptic nationalism
Coptic Orthodox Church
 
History of Oriental Orthodoxy
Collective identity
Religious identity